The 2021 Jacksonville Dolphins baseball team represents Jacksonville University during the 2021 NCAA Division I baseball season. The Dolphins play their home games at John Sessions Stadium as a member of the Atlantic Sun Conference They are led by head coach Chris Hayes, in his fifth year as head coach.

Previous season

The 2020 Jacksonville Dolphins baseball team notched a 9–9 (0–0) regular-season record. The season prematurely ended on March 12, 2020, due to concerns over the COVID-19 pandemic.

Columbia Regional

References 

2021 ASUN Conference baseball season
2021
2021 in sports in Florida
Jacksonville Dolphins